Harry Powell was an English international lawn bowler.

Bowls career
Powell was the champion of England in 1958 (singles) and 1975 (triples) and an England international from 1959 until 1970.

He represented England in the rinks (fours), at the 1970 British Commonwealth Games in Edinburgh, Scotland with Norman Hook, Bobby Stenhouse and Cliff Stroud.

He bowled for Farnborough British Legion BC.

References

English male bowls players
Bowls players at the 1970 British Commonwealth Games
Commonwealth Games competitors for England